The Arenales River (Spanish, Río Arenales) is a river of Argentina. A tributary of the Salado River, the Arenales flows through the city of Salta.

See also
List of rivers of Argentina

References

 Rand McNally, The New International Atlas, 1993.

Rivers of Argentina
Rivers of Salta Province